Sikander 2 is an Indian Punjabi-language action film directed by Manav Shah and written by Dheeraj Rattan. It stars Kartar Cheema, Guri and Swan Rupowali in lead roles. The film was released theatrically on 2 August 2019.

Plot
movie about a homeless man

Cast 
 Kartar Cheema as Teji, whose nickname is Sikander
 Guri as Balli
 Sawan Rupowali as Kiran
 Nikeet Dhillon as Bindu
 Shubh Sandhu as Jodha
 Rahul Jungral as Lakha
 Manjit Singh as Shimla

Soundtrack

Accolades 

At PTC Punjabi Film Awards 2020, the film received the most nominations (13 nominations), including Critics Award for Best Film, Best Actor Critics' (for Kartar Cheema), and Best Direction (for Manav Shah).

References 

2019 films
Punjabi-language Indian films
2010s Punjabi-language films